Events in the year 1920 in Bulgaria.

Incumbents

Events 

 28 March – The Bulgarian Agrarian National Union won 110 of the 229 seats in the parliament following parliamentary elections. Voter turnout was 77.3%.

References 

 
1920s in Bulgaria
Years of the 20th century in Bulgaria
Bulgaria
Bulgaria